Jennifer Lesley Trusted (28 March 1925 – 13 April 2017) was a British philosopher of physics, metaphysics, ethics, and the history of science.

Trusted was born in Cambridge on 28 March 1925. She died on 13 April 2017, at the age of 93.

Published works

References

Sources
 
 

1925 births
2017 deaths
British philosophers
British women philosophers
Ethicists
Metaphysicians
Philosophers of science
People from Cambridge